CBKM may refer to:

 CBKM (AM), a radio rebroadcaster (860 AM) licensed to Blue River, British Columbia, Canada, rebroadcasting CBTK-FM
 CBKM-FM, a radio rebroadcaster (98.5 FM) licensed to Meadow Lake, Saskatchewan, Canada, rebroadcasting CBK